Mount Haeckel is a  mountain summit located on the crest of the Sierra Nevada mountain range in northern California, United States. It is situated on the shared boundary of Kings Canyon National Park with John Muir Wilderness, and along the common border of Fresno County with Inyo County. 
Mount Haeckel ranks as the 71st highest summit in California.

History
In 1895, Sierra Club explorer Theodore S. Solomons named a group of mountains in the Sierra Nevada after exponents of Darwin's theory of evolution. These six peaks are now known collectively as the Evolution Group. This mountain is named for Ernst Haeckel (1834–1919), a German zoologist. The other five peaks were named after Charles Darwin, John Fiske, Alfred Russel Wallace, Herbert Spencer, and Thomas Henry Huxley.

On July 14, 1920, Walter L. Huber led a Sierra Club party of nine climbers to the first ascent of the summit via the West Shoulder. A few minutes later, Edward O. Allen, Francis E. Crofts, and Olcott Haskell arrived via the South Ridge. This second Sierra Club party was surprised that they were not on Mount Darwin, their intended destination.

Climbing
Established climbing routes on Mount Haeckel:

 West Shoulder –  – First Ascent 1920
 South Ridge – class 3 – FA 1920
 North Face – class 3 – FA 1933 by Jack Riegelhuth
 Northeast Ridge – class 4 – FA 1935

The Northwest Arête is considered one of the classic climbing routes in the Sierra Nevada.

Climate
According to the Köppen climate classification system, Mount Haeckel is located in an alpine climate zone. Most weather fronts originate in the Pacific Ocean, and travel east toward the Sierra Nevada mountains. As fronts approach, they are forced upward by the peaks, causing them to drop their moisture in the form of rain or snowfall onto the range (orographic lift). Precipitation runoff from this mountain drains northeast into Bishop Creek, and west into Evolution Creek, which is a San Joaquin River tributary.

Gallery

See also
 
 List of the major 4000-meter summits of California
 Mount Wallace

References

External links
 Weather forecast: Mount Haeckel
 Account of first ascent: Sierra Club Bulletin
 Mt. Haeckel Rock Climbing: Mountainproject.com

Inyo National Forest
Mountains of Inyo County, California
Mountains of Fresno County, California
Mountains of Kings Canyon National Park
Mountains of the John Muir Wilderness
North American 4000 m summits
Mountains of Northern California
Sierra Nevada (United States)